Nik Abdul Aziz bin Nik Mat (10 January 1931 – 12 February 2015) was a Malaysian politician and Muslim cleric. He was the Menteri Besar of Kelantan from 1990 to 2013 and the Mursyidul Am or Spiritual Leader of the Pan-Malaysian Islamic Party (PAS) from 1991 until his death in 2015. Overall, his career as an elected politician lasted for some 48 years following his election to the Parliament of Malaysia in 1967.

Early life
Nik Abdul Aziz was born in Kota Bharu in 1931 as the second of five siblings. He was raised by a single father (Tok Kura) who was an aspiring blacksmith. Nik Aziz's Islamic studies began in pondok schools in Kelantan and Terengganu. He went on to study at Darul Uloom Deoband in Uttar Pradesh, India for five years. He obtained his Bachelor of Arts in Arabic Studies and Master of Arts in Islamic jurisprudence from Al-Azhar University, Egypt. During his university studies, he was one of the witnesses and a civilian to have lived in the heat of the Arab-Israeli Conflict.

Having returned from Egypt, Nik Aziz worked as a teacher at various religious schools in Kelantan including his father's pondok (religious school). Nik Aziz started to teach at various mosques and Pondok within Kelantan and other states. He became a respected Islamic scholar earning the nickname "Tok Guru." (means 'Master/sifu of Scholar or teacher' in Malay)

Political career
Nik Aziz joined PAS in 1967. He contested and won the Kelantan Hilir parliamentary seat by-election in that same year, and held the seat (later renamed Pengkalan Chepa) until 1986. In 1982, he was part of a movement by young members to bring change to the party leadership. PAS had lost the Kelantan state elections in 1978 and, as PAS state commissioner, Nik Aziz began to question president Asri Muda's leadership. Finally, in the PAS Muktamar (General Assembly) that year, Asri was forced to resign.

After stepping aside from federal politics, Nik Aziz won a seat in the Kelantan State Assembly in the 1986 general elections. In 1990, PAS managed to wrest control of Kelantan back from Barisan Nasional. In his capacity as party leader in the state, Nik Aziz became Menteri Besar of Kelantan. He succeeded Yusof Rawa as spiritual leader of PAS in 1991.

Nik Aziz's government was re-elected on four occasions (1995, 1999, 2004, 2008), until his retirement in 2013. During the 1990s, his administration in Kelantan frequently clashed on the role of Islam in Malaysia with the then Prime Minister Mahathir Mohamad. In contrast with the racially exclusive ruling party UMNO, he openly rejected communal politics.

Nik Aziz commanded support from a large number of non-Muslims in Malaysia and played a leading role during PAS' increase in popularity among non-Muslims.

In May 2013, Nik Aziz publicly stated that he did not consent on any co-operation between United Malays National Organisation (UMNO) and Malaysian Islamic Party (PAS) as long as he was alive. However, in September 2019, when PAS and UMNO signed the formal charter of alliance, PAS president Abdul Hadi Awang claimed that Nik Aziz had already consented to the cooperation while he was alive.

Issues

Hardline views
Nik Aziz drew some criticism for his hardline Islamic views. His advocacy of Islamic shariah law for all Malay Muslims drew criticism. According to Fox News, Nik Aziz suggested that women would be at a lower risk of being raped if they abandoned using their lipstick and perfume. He was also recorded once stating that fashionable and sexy-dressing women deserved to be raped during a speech.

The "Allah" issue
In 2012, there was an issue of Catholics in Malaysia using the Arabic term for "God"; "Allah" in their Christian Bible. Initially, Nik Aziz stated that the word "Allah" can be used by non-Muslims as the origin of the word itself is evidently pre-Islamic. The issue caused a stir in the Muslim community. The PAS party was almost divided into two blocs; one that supported the use of the word, and one that did not. Aiming to restore unity in PAS, Nik Aziz took back his words and disapproved of the word "Allah" being used by non-Muslims.

Son detained under ISA
His son Nik Adli was held under the Malaysian Internal Security Act in 2001 for alleged terrorist activities including planning jihad, possession of weapons, and membership in the Kumpulan Mujahidin Malaysia (KMM), an Islamist extremist group. After 5 years in detention without trial, he was released.

Retirement and death
During the 2013 election, PAS once again won a majority of seats to form a Kelantan state government. Nik Aziz announced his retirement as Chief Minister of Kelantan, the post he held since 1990. His successor is Nik Aziz's former deputy Chief Minister Ahmad Yaakob, who took over his office to replace him as Kelantan's Chief Minister. The following day, more than 10,000 people attended his funeral at Masjid Tok Guru, his local mosque. His death triggered the Kelantan State Assembly seat of 2015 Chempaka by-election.

Election results

Note: 1  PAS were in the Alliance (1972–1973) and later Barisan Nasional (1973–1978) coalition government.

Honours

Honours of Malaysia
  :
  Officer of the Order of the Defender of the Realm (KMN) (1974)
  :
  Knight Grand Commander of the Order of the Life of the Crown of Kelantan (SJMK) – Dato' (1995)

References

External links

Official Blog of Tok Guru Nik Aziz Nik Mat

|-

|-

|-

|-

|-

|-

|-

Chief Ministers of Kelantan
Malaysian academics
Sunni Muslim scholars of Islam
1931 births
2015 deaths
Kelantan state executive councillors
Members of the Kelantan State Legislative Assembly
Al-Azhar University alumni
Malaysian Muslims
Members of the Dewan Rakyat
Malaysian Islamic Party politicians
Malaysian people of Malay descent
People from Kelantan
People from Kota Bharu
Deaths from prostate cancer
20th-century Malaysian politicians
21st-century Malaysian politicians
Officers of the Order of the Defender of the Realm
Darul Uloom Deoband alumni